The women's sprint classical at the 2017 Asian Winter Games was held on 20 February 2017 at the Shirahatayama Open Stadium in Sapporo, Japan.

Schedule
All times are Japan Standard Time (UTC+09:00)

Results

Qualification

Quarterfinals

Heat 1

Heat 2

Heat 3

Heat 4

Semifinals

Heat 1

Heat 2

Finals

Final B

Final A

 Ju Hye-ri was awarded bronze because Australia as guest nation, was ineligible to win any medals.

References

External links
Results at FIS website

Women sprint